Scientology is a set of beliefs and practices invented by the American author L. Ron Hubbard, and an associated movement. Adherents are called Scientologists. It has been variously defined as a cult, a business, or a new religious movement. The primary exponent of Scientology is the Church of Scientology, a centralized and hierarchical organization based in Florida, although many practitioners exist independently of the Church, in what is called the Free Zone. Estimates put the number of Scientologists at under 40,000 worldwide.

Scientology texts say that a human possesses an immortal inner self, termed a thetan, that resides in the physical body and has experienced many past lives. Scientologists believe that traumatic events experienced by the thetan over its lifetimes have resulted in negative "engrams" forming in the mind, causing neuroses and mental problems. They claim that the practice of auditing can remove these engrams; Scientology groups charge fees for clients undergoing auditing. Once these engrams have been removed, an individual is given the status of "clear". They can take part in a further series of activities that are termed "Operating Thetan" (OT) levels, which require further payments.

The Operating Thetan texts are kept secret from most followers, and are only revealed after adherents have typically given hundreds of thousands of dollars to the organization in order to complete what Scientology refers to as The Bridge to Total Freedom. The Scientology organization has gone to considerable lengths to try to maintain the secrecy of the texts but they are freely available on the internet. These texts say that lives preceding a thetan's arrival on Earth were lived in extraterrestrial cultures. Scientology doctrine states that any Scientologist undergoing "auditing" will eventually come across and recount what is called the "Incident". The secret texts refer to an alien being called Xenu. They say Xenu was a ruler of a confederation of planets 70 million years ago who brought billions of aliens to Earth and then killed them with thermonuclear weapons. Despite being kept secret from most followers, this forms the central mythological framework of Scientology's ostensible soteriology. These aspects have become the subject of popular ridicule.

Hubbard wrote primarily science fiction, and had experience with religions such as Thelema. In the late 1940s he created Dianetics, a set of practices which he presented as therapy. Over time, he came to consider auditing useful not just for problems of the mind, but also of the spirit, developing Scientology as an expansion of Dianetics. Although he had framed Dianetics as a "science" — a characterisation rejected by the medical establishment — in the 1950s, for pragmatic legal reasons, he increasingly portrayed Scientology as a religion. In 1954 he established the Church of Scientology in Los Angeles before swiftly establishing similar organisations internationally. Relations with various governments were strained. In the 1970s Hubbard's followers engaged in a program of criminal infiltration of the U.S. government, resulting in several executives of the organization being convicted and imprisoned for multiple offenses by a U.S. Federal Court. Becoming increasingly reclusive, Hubbard built an elite group called the Sea Organization around himself. After Hubbard's death in 1986, David Miscavige became head of the Church. From the 1980s, various senior Church members left and established groups such as Ron's Org, forming the basis of the Free Zone. 

From soon after their formation, Hubbard's groups have generated considerable opposition and controversy, in several instances because of their illegal activities.  In January 1951, the New Jersey Board of Medical Examiners brought proceedings against the Dianetic Research Foundation on the charge of teaching medicine without a license. Hubbard himself was convicted in absentia of fraud by a French court  in 1978 and sentenced to four years in prison. In 1992, a court in Canada convicted the Scientology organization in Toronto of spying on law enforcement and government agencies, and criminal breach of trust, later upheld by the Ontario Court of Appeal. The Church of Scientology was convicted of fraud by a French court in 2009, a judgment upheld by the supreme Court of Cassation in 2013.

The Church of Scientology has been described by government inquiries, international parliamentary bodies, scholars, law lords, and numerous superior court judgments as both a dangerous cult and a manipulative profit-making business. Following extensive litigation in numerous countries, the organization has managed to attain a legal recognition as a religious institution in some jurisdictions, including Australia, Italy, and the United States. Germany classifies Scientology groups as an "anti-constitutional sect", while the French government classifies the group as a dangerous cult.

Definition and classification
The sociologist Stephen A. Kent views the Church of Scientology as "a multifaceted transnational corporation, only one element of which is religious". The historian of religion Hugh Urban described Scientology as a "huge, complex, and multifaceted movement". Scientology has experienced multiple schisms during its history. While the Church of Scientology was the original promoter of the movement, various independent groups have split off to form independent Scientology groups. Referring to the "different types of Scientology," the scholar of religion Aled Thomas suggested it was appropriate to talk about "Scientologies".

Urban described Scientology as representing a "rich syncretistic blend" of sources, including elements from Hinduism and Buddhism, Thelema, new scientific ideas, science-fiction, and from psychology and popular self-help literature available by the mid-20th century. The ceremonies, structure of the prayers, and attire worn by ministers in the Church all reflect the influence of Protestantism.

Hubbard claimed that Scientology was "all-denominational", and members of the Church are not prohibited from active involvement in other religions. Scholar of religion Donald Westbrook encountered Church members who also practiced Judaism, Christianity, Buddhism, and the Nation of Islam; one was a Baptist minister. In practice, however, Westbrook noted that most Church members consider Scientology to be their only commitment, and the deeper their involvement in the Church became, the less likely they were to continue practicing other traditions.

Debates over classification

Arguments as to whether Scientology should be regarded as a cult, a business, or a religion have gone on for many years. Many Scientologists consider it to be their religion. Its founder, L. Ron Hubbard, presented it as such, but the early history of the Scientology organization, and Hubbard's policy directives, letters, and instructions to subordinates, indicate that his motivation for doing so was as a legally pragmatic move. In many countries the Church of Scientology has engaged in legal challenges to secure recognition as a tax-exempt religious organization, and it is now legally recognized as such in some jurisdictions, including the United States, but in only a minority of those in which it operates.

Many scholars of religion have referred to Scientology as a religion, as has the Oxford English Dictionary. The sociologist Bryan R. Wilson compared Scientology with 20 criteria that he associated with religion and concluded that the movement could be characterised as such. Allan W. Black analysed Scientology through the seven "dimensions of religion" set forward by the scholar Ninian Smart and also decided that Scientology met those criteria for being a religion. The sociologist David V. Barrett noted that there was a "strong body of evidence to suggest that it makes sense to regard Scientology as a religion", while scholar of religion James R. Lewis commented that "it is obvious that Scientology is a religion."

More specifically, many scholars have described Scientology as a new religious movement. Various scholars have also considered it within the category of Western esotericism, while the scholar of religion Andreas Grünschloß noted that it was "closely linked" to UFO religions, as science-fiction themes are evident in its theology. Scholars have also varyingly described it as a "psychotherapeutically oriented religion", a "secularized religion," a "postmodern religion," a "privatized religion," and a "progressive-knowledge" religion. According to scholar of religion Mary Farrell Bednarowski, Scientology describes itself as drawing on science, religion, psychology and philosophy but "had been claimed by none of them and repudiated, for the most part, by all".

Government inquiries, international parliamentary bodies, scholars, law lords, and numerous superior court judgments have described Scientology both as a dangerous cult and as a manipulative profit-making business.. These seriously question the categorisation of Scientology as a religion. An article in the magazine TIME, "The Thriving Cult of Greed and Power", described Scientology as "a ruthless global scam". The Church of Scientology's attempts to sue the publishers for libel and to prevent republication abroad were dismissed. The notion of Scientology as a religion is strongly opposed by the anti-cult movement. The Church has not received recognition as a religious organization in the majority of countries it operates in; its claims to a religious identity have been particularly rejected in continental Europe, where anti-Scientology activists have had a greater impact on public discourse than in Anglophone countries. These critics maintain that the Church is a commercial business that falsely claims to be religious, or alternatively a form of therapy masquerading as religion. Grünschloß commented that those rejecting the categorisation of Scientology as a religion acted under the "misunderstanding" that to call it a religion means that "one has approved of its basic goodness". He stressed that labelling Scientology a religion does not mean that it is "automatically promoted as harmless, nice, good, and humane".

Etymology
The word Scientology, as coined by Hubbard, is a derivation from the Latin word scientia ("knowledge", "skill"), which comes from the verb scīre ("to know"), with the suffix -ology, from the Greek λόγος lógos ("word" or "account [of]"). Hubbard claimed that the word "Scientology" meant "knowing about knowing or science of knowledge". The name "Scientology" deliberately makes use of the word "science", seeking to benefit from the "prestige and perceived legitimacy" of natural science in the public imagination. In doing so Scientology has been compared to religious groups like Christian Science and the Science of Mind which employed similar tactics.

The term "Scientology" had been used in published works at least twice before Hubbard. In The New Word (1901) poet and lawyer Allen Upward first used scientology to mean blind, unthinking acceptance of scientific doctrine (compare scientism). In 1934, philosopher Anastasius Nordenholz published Scientology: Science of the Constitution and Usefulness of Knowledge, which used the term to mean the science of science. It is unknown whether Hubbard was aware of either prior usage of the word.

History

Hubbard's early life

Hubbard was born in 1911 in Tilden, Nebraska, the son of a U.S. naval officer. His family were Methodists. Six months later they moved to Oklahoma, and then to Montana, living on a ranch near Helena. In 1923, Hubbard moved to Washington DC. In 1927, he made a summer trip to Hawaii, China, Japan, the Philippines, and Guam, following this with a longer visit to East Asia in 1928. In 1929 he returned to the U.S. to complete high school. In 1930, he enrolled at George Washington University, where he began writing and publishing stories. He left university after two years and in 1933 married his first wife, Margaret "Polly" Grubb.

Becoming a professional writer for pulp magazines, Hubbard was elected president of the New York chapter of the American Fiction Guild in 1935. His first novel, Buckskin Brigades, appeared in 1937. From 1938 through till the 1950s, he was part of a group of writers associated with the pulp magazine Astounding Science-Fiction. Urban related that Hubbard became one of the "key figures" in the "golden age" of pulp fiction. In a later document called Excalibur, he recalled a near death experience while under anaesthetic during a dental operation in 1938.

In 1940, Hubbard was commissioned as a lieutenant (junior grade) in the U.S. Navy. After the Pearl Harbor attack brought the U.S. into the Second World War, he was called to active duty, sent to the Philippines and then Australia. After the war, he married for a second time and returned to writing. He became involved with rocket scientist Jack Parsons and the latter's Agape Lodge, a Pasadena group practicing Thelema, the religion founded by occultist Aleister Crowley. Hubbard later broke from the group and eloped with Parsons' girlfriend Betty. The Church of Scientology later claimed that Hubbard's involvement with the Agape Lodge was at the behest of the U.S. intelligence services, although no evidence has appeared to substantiate this. In 1952, Hubbard would call Crowley a "very good friend," despite having never met him. Although the Church of Scientology denies any influence from Thelema, Urban identified a "significant amount of Crowley's influence in the early Scientology beliefs and practices of the 1950s".

Dianetics and the origins of Scientology: 1950-1954

During the late 1940s, Hubbard began developing a therapy system called Dianetics, first producing an unpublished manuscript on the subject in 1948. He subsequently published his ideas as the article "Dianetics: The Evolution of a Science" in Astounding Science Fiction in May 1950. The magazine's editor, John W. Campbell, was sympathetic.

Later that year, Hubbard published his ideas as the book, Dianetics: The Modern Science of Mental Health. Published by Hermitage House, the first edition contained an introduction from medical doctor Joseph A. Winter and an appendix by the philosopher Will Durant. Dianetics subsequently spent 28 weeks as a New York Times bestseller. Urban suggested that Dianetics was "arguably the first major book of do-it-yourself psychotherapy".

Dianetics describes a "counseling" technique known as "auditing" in which an auditor assists a subject in conscious recall of traumatic events in the individual's past. It was originally intended to be a new psychotherapy. The stated intent is to free individuals of the influence of past traumas by systematic exposure and removal of the engrams (painful memories) these events have left behind, a process called clearing.

In April 1950 Hubbard founded the Hubbard Dianetic Research Foundation (HDRF) in Elizabeth, New Jersey. He began offering courses teaching people how to become auditors and lectured on the topic around the country. Hubbard's ideas generated a new Dianetics movement, which grew swiftly, partly because it was more accessible than psychotherapy and promised more immediate progress. Individuals and small groups practicing Dianetics appeared in various places across the U.S. and United Kingdom.

Hubbard continually sought to refine his Dianetics techniques.
In 1951, he introduced E-Meters into the auditing process. The original "Book One Auditing," which Hubbard promoted in the late 1940s and early 1950s, did not use an E-Meter, but simply entailed a question and answer session between the auditor and client. 

Hubbard labelled Dianetics a "science," rather than considering it a religion. At that time his expressed views of religion were largely negative. He approached both the American Psychiatric Association and the American Medical Association, but neither took Dianetics seriously. Dr. Winter, hoping to have Dianetics accepted in the medical community, submitted papers outlining the principles and methodology of Dianetic therapy to the Journal of the American Medical Association and the American Journal of Psychiatry in 1949, but these were rejected. Much of the medical establishment and the Food and Drug Administration (FDA) were sceptical and critical of Dianetics; they regarded his ideas as pseudomedicine and pseudoscience. During the early 1950s, several Dianetics practitioners were arrested, charged with practicing medicine without a license.

Hubbard explicitly distanced Dianetics from hypnotism, claiming that the two were diametrically opposed in purpose. However, he acknowledged having used hypnotism during his early research, and various acquaintances reported observing him engaged in hypnotism, sometimes for entertainment purposes. Hubbard also acknowledged certain similarities between his ideas and Freudian psychoanalysis, although maintained that Dianetics provided more adequate solutions to a person's problems than Sigmund Freud's ideas. Hubbard's thought was parallel with the trend of humanist psychology at that time, which also came about in the 1950s.

As Dianetics developed, Hubbard began claiming that auditing was revealing evidence that people could recall past lives and thus provided evidence of an inner soul or spirit. This shift into metaphysical territory was reflected in Hubbard's second major book on Dianetics, Science of Survival (1951). Some Dianetics practitioners distanced themselves from these claims, believing that they veered into supernaturalism and away from Dianetics' purported scientific credentials. Several of Hubbard's followers, including Campbell and Winter, distanced themselves from Hubbard, citing the latter's dogmatism and authoritarianism.

By April 1951, Hubbard's HDRF was facing financial ruin and in 1952 it entered voluntary bankruptcy. Following the bankruptcy, stewardship of the Dianetics copyrights transferred from Hubbard to Don Purcell, who had provided the HDRF with financial support. Purcell then established his own Dianetics center in Wichita, Kansas. Hubbard distanced himself from Purcell's group and moved to Phoenix, Arizona, where he formed the Hubbard Association of Scientologists. Westbrook commented that Hubbard's development of the term "Scientology" was "born in part out of legal necessity," because Purcell owned the copyrights to Dianetics, but also reflected "Hubbard's new philosophical and theological practices". In the early texts written that year, Hubbard presented Scientology as a new "science" rather than as a religion. In March 1952 he married his third wife, Mary Sue Whipp, who became an important part of his new Scientology movement.

Establishing the Church of Scientology: 1951-1965

As the 1950s developed, Hubbard saw the advantages of having his Scientology movement legally recognised as a religion. Urban noted that Hubbard's efforts to redefine Scientology as a religion occurred "gradually, in fits and starts, and largely in response to internal and external events that made such a definition of the movement both expedient and necessary". These influences included challenges to Hubbard's authority within Dianetics, attacks from external groups like the FDA and American Medical Association, and Hubbard's growing interest in Asian religions and past life memories.

Several other science-fiction writers, and Hubbard's son, have reported that they heard Hubbard comment that the way to make money was to start a religion. 
Harlan Ellison has told a story of seeing Hubbard at a gathering of the Hydra Club in 1953 or 1954. Hubbard was complaining of not being able to make a living on what he was being paid as a science fiction writer. Ellison says that Lester del Rey told Hubbard that what he needed to do to get rich was start a religion.

L. Ron Hubbard originally intended for Scientology to be considered a science, as stated in his writings. In May 1952, Scientology was organized to put this intended science into practice, and in the same year, Hubbard published a new set of teachings as Scientology, a religious philosophy. Marco Frenschkowski quotes Hubbard in a letter written in 1953, to show that he never denied that his original approach was not a religious one: "Probably the greatest discovery of Scientology and its most forceful contribution to mankind has been the isolation, description and handling of the human spirit, accomplished in July 1951, in Phoenix, Arizona. I established, along scientific rather than religious or humanitarian lines that the thing which is the person, the personality, is separable from the body and the mind at will and without causing bodily death or derangement. (Hubbard 1983: 55)."

Following the prosecution of Hubbard's foundation for teaching medicine without a license, in April 1953 Hubbard wrote a letter proposing that Scientology should be transformed into a religion. As membership declined and finances grew tighter, Hubbard had reversed the hostility to religion he voiced in Dianetics. His letter discussed the legal and financial benefits of religious status. Hubbard outlined plans for setting up a chain of "Spiritual Guidance Centers" charging customers $500 for twenty-four hours of auditing ("That is real money ... Charge enough and we'd be swamped."). Hubbard wrote:

In December 1953, Hubbard incorporated three organizations – a "Church of American Science", a "Church of Scientology" and a "Church of Spiritual Engineering" – in Camden, New Jersey. On February 18, 1954, with Hubbard's blessing, some of his followers set up the first local Church of Scientology, the Church of Scientology of California, adopting the "aims, purposes, principles and creed of the Church of American Science, as founded by L. Ron Hubbard".

In 1955, Hubbard established the Founding Church of Scientology in Washington, D.C. The group declared that the Founding Church, as written in the certificate of incorporation for the Founding Church of Scientology in the District of Columbia, was to "act as a parent church for the religious faith known as 'Scientology' and to act as a church for the religious worship of the faith".

During this period the organization expanded to Australia, New Zealand, France, the United Kingdom and elsewhere. In 1959, Hubbard purchased Saint Hill Manor in East Grinstead, Sussex, United Kingdom, which became the worldwide headquarters of the Church of Scientology and his personal residence. During Hubbard's years at Saint Hill, he traveled, providing lectures and training in Australia, South Africa in the United States, and developing materials that would eventually become Scientology's "core systematic theology and praxis.

With the FDA increasingly suspicious of E-Meters, in an October 1962 policy letter Hubbard stressed that these should be presented as religious, rather than medical devices. In January 1963, FDA agents raided offices of the organization, seizing over a hundred E-meters as illegal medical devices and tons of literature that they accused of making false medical claims. The original suit by the FDA to condemn the literature and E-meters did not succeed, but the court ordered the organization to label every meter with a disclaimer that it is purely religious artifact, to post a $20,000 bond of compliance, and to pay the FDA's legal expenses.

In the course of developing Scientology, Hubbard presented rapidly changing teachings that some have seen as often self-contradictory. According to Lindholm, for the inner cadre of Scientologists in that period, involvement depended not so much on belief in a particular doctrine but on unquestioning faith in Hubbard.

With the Church often under heavy criticism, it adopted strong measures of attack in dealing with its critics. In 1966, the Church established a Guardian's Office (GO), an intelligence unit devoted to undermining those hostile towards Scientology. The GO launched an extensive program of countering negative publicity, gathering intelligence, and infiltrating hostile organizations. In "Operation Snow White", the GO infiltrated the IRS and several other government departments and stole, photocopied, and then returned tens of thousands of documents pertaining to the Church, politicians, and celebrities.

Hubbard's later life: 1966-1986

In 1966, Hubbard resigned as executive director of the Church. From that point on, he focused on developing the advanced levels of training. In 1967, Hubbard established a new elite group, the Sea Organization or "SeaOrg", the membership of which was drawn from the most committed members of the Church. With its members living communally and holding senior positions in the Church, the SeaOrg was initially based on three ocean-going ships, the Diana, the Athena, and the Apollo. Reflecting Hubbard's fascination for the navy, members had naval titles and uniforms. In 1975, the SeaOrg moved its operations from the ships to the new Flag Land Base in Clearwater, Florida.

In 1972, facing criminal charges in France, Hubbard returned to the United States and began living in an apartment in Queens, New York.
In July 1977, police raids on Church premises in Washington DC and Los Angeles revealed the extent of the GO's infiltration into government departments and other groups. 11 officials and agents of the Church were indicted; in December 1979 they were sentenced to between 4 and 5 years each and individually fined $10,000. Among those found guilty was Hubbard's then-wife, Mary Sue Hubbard. Public revelation of the GO's activities brought widespread condemnation of the Church. The Church responded by closing down the GO and expelling those convicted of illegal activities. A new Office of Special Affairs replaced the GO. A Watchdog Committee was set up in May 1979, and in September it declared that it now controlled all senior management in the Church.

At the start of the 1980s, Hubbard withdrew from public life, with only a small number of senior Scientologists ever seeing him again. 1980 and 1981 saw significant revamping at the highest levels of the Church hierarchy, with many senior members being demoted or leaving the Church. By 1981, the 21-year old David Miscavige, who had been one of Hubbard's closest aides in the SeaOrg, rose to prominence. That year, the All Clear Unit (ACU) was established to take on Hubbard's responsibilities. In 1981, the Church of Scientology International was formally established, as was the profit-making Author Services Incorporated (ASI), which controlled the publishing of Hubbard's work. In 1982, this was followed by the creation of the Religious Technology Center, which controlled all trademarks and service marks. The Church had continued to grow; in 1980 it had centers in 52 countries, and by 1992 that was up to 74. 

Some senior members who found themselves side-lined regarded Miscavige's rise to dominance as a coup, believing that Hubbard no longer had control over the Church. Expressing opposition to the changes was senior member Bill Robertson, former captain of the Sea Org's flagship, Apollo. At an October 1983 meeting, Robertson claimed that the organization had been infiltrated by government agents and was being corrupted. In 1984 he established a rival Scientology group, Ron's Org, and coined the term "Free Org" which came to encompass all Scientologists outside the Church. Robertson's departure was the first major schism within Scientology. 

During his seclusion, Hubbard continued writing. His The Way to Happiness was a response to a perceived decline in public morality. He also returned to writing fiction, including the sci-fi epic Battlefield Earth and the 10-volume Mission Earth. In 1980, Church member Gerry Armstrong was given access to Hubbard's private archive so as to conduct research for an official Hubbard biography. Armstrong contacted the Messengers to raise discrepancies between the evidence he discovered and the Church's claims regarding Hubbard's life; he duly left the Church and took Church papers with him, which they regained after taking him to court. Hubbard died at his ranch in Creston, California on January 24, 1986.

After Hubbard: 1986-

Miscavige succeeded Hubbard as head of the Church.
In 1991, Time magazine published a frontpage story attacking the Church. The latter responded by filing a lawsuit and launching a major public relations campaign. In 1993, the Internal Revenue Service dropped all litigation against the Church and recognized it as a religious organization, with the UK's home office also recognizing it as a religious organization in 1996. The Church then focused its opposition towards the Cult Awareness Network (CAN), a major anti-cult group. The Church was part of a coalition of groups what successfully sued CAN, which then collapsed as a result of bankruptcy in 1996.

In 2008, the online activist collective Anonymous launched Project Chanology with the stated aim of destroying the Church; this entailed denial of service attacks against Church websites and demonstrations outside its premises. In 2009, the St Petersburg Times began a new series of exposes surrounding alleged abuse of Church members, especially at their re-education camp at Gilman Hot Springs in California. As well as prompting episodes of BBC's Panorama and CNN's AC360 investigating the allegations, these articles launched a new series of negative press articles and books presenting themselves as exposes of the Church. 

In 2009, the Church established relations with the Nation of Islam (NOI). Over coming years, thousands of NOI members received introductory Dianetics training. In 2012, Lewis commented on a recent decline in Church membership. Those leaving for the Freezone included large numbers of high-level, long-term Scientologists, among them Mark Rathbun and Mike Rinder.

Beliefs and practices

Hubbard lies at the core of Scientology. His writings remain the source of Scientology's doctrines and practices, with the sociologist of religion David G. Bromley describing the religion as Hubbard's "personal synthesis of philosophy, physics, and psychology". Hubbard claimed that he developed his ideas through research and experimentation, rather than through revelation from a supernatural source. He published hundreds of articles and books over the course of his life, writings that Scientologists regard as scripture. The Church encourages people to read his work chronologically, in the order in which it was written. It claims that Hubbard's work is perfect and no elaboration or alteration is permitted. Hubbard described Scientology as an "applied religious philosophy" because, according to him, it consists of a metaphysical doctrine, a theory of psychology, and teachings in morality.

Hubbard developed thousands of neologisms during his lifetime. The nomenclature used by the movement is termed "Scientologese" by members. Scientologists are expected to learn this specialist terminology, the use of which separates followers from non-Scientologists. The Church refers to its practices as "technology," a term often shortened to "Tech". Scientologists stress the "standardness" of this "tech", by which they express belief in its infallibility. The Church's system of pedagogy is called "Study Tech" and is presented as the best method for learning. Scientology teaches that when reading, it is very important not to go past a word one does not understand. A person should instead consult a dictionary as to the meaning of the word before progressing, something Scientology calls "word clearing".

The scholar of religion Dorthe Refslund Christensen described Scientology as being "a religion of practice" rather than "a religion of belief".  According to Scientology, its beliefs and practices are based on rigorous research, and its doctrines are accorded a significance equivalent to scientific laws. Blind belief is held to be of lesser significance than the practical application of Scientologist methods. Adherents are encouraged to validate the practices through their personal experience. Hubbard put it this way: "For a Scientologist, the final test of any knowledge he has gained is, 'did the data and the use of it in life actually improve conditions or didn't it? Many Scientologists avoid using the words "belief" or "faith" to describe how Hubbard's teachings impacts their lives, preferring to say that they "know" it to be true.

Theology and cosmology 

Scientology refers to the existence of a Supreme Being, but practitioners are not expected to worship it. No intercessions are made to seek this Being's assistance in daily life.

Hubbard referred to the physical universe as the MEST universe, meaning "Matter, Energy, Space and Time". In Scientology's teaching, this MEST universe is separate from the theta universe, which consists of life, spirituality, and thought. Scientology teaches that the MEST universe is fabricated through the agreement of all thetans (souls or spirits) that it exists, and is therefore an illusion that is only given reality through the actions of thetans themselves.

The Bridge to Total Freedom

Thomas noted that "the primary focus of Scientology is self-improvement", while scholar of religion Donald Westbrook called it "a religion of self-knowledge". In pursuing a path of self-discovery and self-improvement, Scientologists are expected to be dedicated and actively practice its teachings. Following Hubbard, Scientologists refer to this process as "the Bridge to Total Freedom" or simply "the Bridge". 

As promoted by the Church, Scientology involves progressing through a series of levels, at each of which the practitioner is deemed to gain release from certain problems as well as enhanced abilities. The degree system was probably adopted from earlier European organisation such as Freemasonry and the Hermetic Order of the Golden Dawn. Each of these levels, considered a step on "the Bridge," has a clear concluding point, termed the "End Phenomenon" or "EP", and completing it is sometimes celebrated with a ceremony termed a "graduation". In the Church, the path across the Bridge is "commercialized and monetized," with charges levied for each degree. Proceeding through the Bridge with the Church can cost hundreds of thousands of US dollars. This monetization of spiritual progression has been a recurring source of criticism of Scientology.

The upper levels are reserved for the most committed and well-trained Scientologists. Many of its teachings are private and not disclosed to outsiders. Although many of Hubbard's writings and other Scientology documents are protected by the Church and not accessible to either non-members or members below a certain rank, some of them have been leaked by ex-members. In trying to prevent dissemination of its secret teachings, the Church has pointed to the respect often accorded to indigenous religions by those refusing to disseminate their secret traditions, arguing that it should be accorded the same respect.

Body and thetan

Hubbard taught that there were three "Parts of Man," the spirit, mind, and body. The first of these is a person's "true" inner self, a "theta being" or "thetan." While the thetan is akin to the idea of the soul or spirit found in other traditions, Hubbard avoided terms like "soul" or "spirit" because of their cultural baggage. Hubbard stated that "the thetan is the person. You are YOU in a body." According to Hubbard, the thetan uses the mind as a means of controlling the body. Scientology teaches that the thetan usually resides within the human skull but can also leave the body, either remaining in close contact with it or being separated altogether.

According to Scientology, a person's thetan has existed for trillions of years, having lived countless lifetimes, long before entering a physical body it may now inhabit. In their original form, the thetans were simply energy, separate from the physical universe. Each thetan had its own "Home Universe," and it was through the collision of these that the physical MEST universe emerged. Once MEST was created, Scientology teaches, the thetans began experimenting with human form, ultimately losing knowledge of their origins and becoming trapped in physical bodies. Scientology also maintains that a series of "universal incidents" have undermined the thetans' ability to recall their origins.

Hubbard taught that thetans brought the material universe into being largely for their own pleasure. The universe has no independent reality but derives its apparent reality from the fact that thetans agree it exists. Thetans fell from grace when they began to identify with their creation rather than their original state of spiritual purity. Eventually they lost their memory of their true nature, along with the associated spiritual and creative powers. As a result, thetans came to think of themselves as nothing but embodied beings.

Reincarnation
Scientology teaches the existence of reincarnation; Hubbard taught that each individual has experienced "past lives", although generally avoided using the term "reincarnation" itself. The movement claims that once a body dies, the thetan enters another body which is preparing to be born. It rejects the idea that the thetan will be born into a non-human animal on Earth. In Have You Lived Before This Life?, Hubbard recounted accounts of past lives stretching back 55 billion years, often on other planets.

Exteriorization

In Scientology, "exteriorization" refers to the thetan leaving the physical body, if only for a short time, during which it is not encumbered by the physical universe and exists in its original state. Scientology aims to "exteriorize" the thetan from the body, so that the thetan remains close to the body and capable of controlling its actions, but not inside of it, where it can confuse "beingness with mass" and the body. In this way, it seeks to ensure the thetan is unaffected by the trauma of the physical universe while still retaining full control of the mind and body. Some Scientologists claim that they experienced exteriorization while auditing, while Westbrook encountered one high-ranking Church member who reported being exterior most of the time.

The purpose of Scientology is to free the thetan from the confines of the physical MEST universe, thus returning it to its original state. This idea of liberating the spiritual self from the physical universe has drawn comparisons with Buddhism. Although Hubbard's understanding of Buddhism during the 1950s was limited, Scientological literature has presented its teachings as the continuation and fulfilment of The Buddha's ideas. In one publication, Hubbard toyed with the idea that he was Maitreya, the future enlightened being prophesied in some forms of Mahayana Buddhism; some Scientologists do regard him as Maitreya. The concept of the thetan has also been observed as being very similar to those promulgated in various mid-20th century UFO religions.

Reactive mind, traumatic memories, and auditing

Prior to establishing Scientology, Hubbard formed a system termed "Dianetics", and it is from this that Scientology grew. Dianetics presents two major divisions of the mind: the analytical and the reactive mind. Dianetics claims that the analytical mind is accurate, rational, and logical, representing what Hubbard called a "flawless computer". The reactive mind is thought to record all pain and emotional trauma. 

Hubbard claimed that the "reactive" mind stores traumatic experiences in pictorial forms which he termed "engrams". Dianetics holds that even if the traumatic experience is forgotten, the engram remains embedded in the reactive mind. Hubbard maintained that humans develop engrams from as far back as during incubation in the womb, as well as from their "past lives". Hubbard taught that these engrams cause people problems, ranging from neurosis and physical sickness to insanity. The existence of engrams has never been verified through scientific investigation. 

Scientology maintains that the mind holds a timeline of a person's memories, called the "time track". Each specific memory is a "lock".

Auditing

According to Dianetics, engrams can be deleted through a process termed "auditing". Auditing remains the central activity within Scientology, and has been described by scholars of religion as Scientology's "core ritual", "primary ritual activity," and "most sacred process". The person being audited is called the "Pre-Clear"; the person conducting the procedure is the "auditor". Auditing usually involves a question and answer session between an auditor and their client, the Pre-Clear. 

An electronic device called the Hubbard Electrometer or electro-psychometer, or more commonly the E-meter, is also typically involved. The client holds two metal canisters, which are connected via a cable to the main box part of the device. This emits a small electrical flow through the client and then back into the box, where it is measured on a needle. It thus detects fluctuations in electrical resistance within the client's body.

The auditor operates two dials on the main part of the device; the larger is the "tone arm" and is used to adjust the voltage, while the smaller "sensitivity knob" influences the amplitude of the needle's movement. The auditor then interprets the needle's movements as it responds when the client is asked and answers questions. The movement of the needle is not visible to the client and the auditor writes down their observations rather than relaying them to the client. Hubbard claimed that the E-Meter "measures emotional reaction by tiny electrical impulses generated by thought". Scientologists believe that the auditor locates the points of resistance and converts their form into energy, which can then be discharged. The auditor is believed to be able to detect items that the client may not wish to admit or which is concealed below the latter's consciousness. 

During the auditing process, the auditor is trained to observe the client's emotional state in accordance with an "emotional tone scale". The tone scale stretches from tone 0.0, marking "death", to tone 40.0, meaning "Serenity of Beingness". The client will be located at different points on the tone scale according to their present emotional state. Scientologists maintain that knowing a person's place on the scale makes it easier to predict his or her actions and assists in bettering his or her condition.
Auditing can be an emotional experience for the client, with some crying during it. Many ex-Scientologists still believe in the efficacy of Dianetics. Urban reported that "even the most cynical ex-Scientologists I've talked to recount many positive experiences, insights, and realizations achieved through auditing."

Scientology doctrine claims that through auditing, people can solve their problems and free themselves of engrams. It also claims that this restores them to their "natural condition" as thetans and enables them to be "at cause" in their daily lives, responding rationally and creatively to life events, rather than reacting to them under the direction of stored engrams.
Once an area of concern has been identified, the auditor asks the individual specific questions about it to help him or her eliminate the difficulty, and uses the E-meter to confirm that the "charge" has been dissipated. As the individual progresses up the "Bridge to Total Freedom", the focus of auditing moves from simple engrams to engrams of increasing complexity and other difficulties. At the more advanced OT levels, Scientologists act as their own auditors ("solo auditors").

Complications and costs

Scientology teaches that auditing can be hindered if the client is under the influence of drugs. Clients are thus advised to undertake the Purification Rundown for two to three weeks to detoxify the body prior to embarking on an auditing course. Also known as the Purification Program or Purif, the Purification Rundown focuses on removing the influence of both medical and recreational drugs from the body through a routine of exercise, saunas, and healthy eating. The Church has Purification Centres where these activities can take place in most of its Orgs, while Free Zone Scientologists have sometimes employed public saunas for the purpose. Other Freezoners have argued that the impact of drugs can be countered through ordinary auditing, with no need for the Purification Rundown.

If a client is deemed to lack the appropriate energy to undergo auditing at a particular time, the auditor may take them on a "locational," a guided walk in which they are asked to look at objects they pass by. If auditing fails in its goals, Scientologists often believe that this is due to a lack of sincerity on the part of the person being audited. Hubbard insisted that the E-Meter was infallible and that any errors were down to the auditor rather than the device.

Undertaking a full course of auditing with the Church is expensive, although the prices are not often advertised publicly. In a 1964 letter, Hubbard stated that a 25 hour block of auditing should cost the equivalent of "three months' pay for the average middle class working individual." In 2007, the fee for a 12 and a half hour block of auditing at the Church's Tampa Org was $4000. The Church is often criticised for the prices it charges for auditing. Hubbard stated that charging for auditing was necessary because the practice required an exchange, and should the auditor not receive something for their services it could harm both parties.

Going Clear
In Scientology's teaching, removing all engrams from a person's mind transforms them from being "Pre-Clear" to a state of "Clear". Once a person is Clear, Scientology teaches that they are capable of new levels of spiritual awareness. In the 1960s, the Church stated that a "Clear is wholly himself with incredible awareness and power." It claims that a Clear will have better health, improved hearing and eyesight, and greatly increased intelligence; Hubbard claimed that Clears do not suffer from colds or allergies. Hubbard stated that anyone who becomes Clear will have "complete recall of everything which has ever happened to him or anything he has ever studied".
Individuals who have reached Clear have claimed a range of superhuman abilities, including seeing through walls, remote viewing, and telepathic communication, although the Church discourages them from displaying their advanced powers to anyone but senior Church members.

Hubbard claimed that once a person reaches Clear, they will remain that way permanently. The Church marks the attainment of Clear status by giving an individual their own International Clear Number, which is marked on a silver bracelet, and a certificate.  Hubbard first began presenting people that it claimed had reached Clear to the public in the 1950s. In 1979, it claimed that 16,849 people had gone Clear, and in 2018 claimed 69,657 Clears. In 2019, Westbrook suggested that "at least 90%" of Church members had yet to reach the state of Clear, meaning that the "vast majority" remained on the lower half of the Bridge. Scientology's aim is to "clear the planet", that is, clear all people in the world of their engrams.

Introspection Rundown

The Introspection Rundown is a controversial Church of Scientology auditing process that is intended to handle a psychotic episode or complete mental breakdown. Introspection is defined for the purpose of this rundown as a condition where the person is "looking into one's own mind, feelings, reactions, etc."  The Introspection Rundown came under public scrutiny after the death of Lisa McPherson in 1995.

The Operating Thetan levels

The degrees above the level of Clear are called "Operating Thetan" or OT. Hubbard described there as being 15 OT levels, although had only completed eight of these during his lifetime. OT levels nine to 15 have not been reached by any Scientologist; in 1988 the Church stated that OT levels nine and ten would only be released when certain benchmarks in the Church's expansion had been achieved.

To gain the OT levels of training, a Church member must go to one of the Advanced Organisations or Orgs, which are based in Los Angeles, Clearwater, East Grinstead, Copenhagen, Sydney, and Johannesburg. OT levels six and seven are only available at Clearwater. The highest level, OT eight, is disclosed only at sea on the Scientology ship Freewinds, operated by the Flag Ship Service Org. Scholar of religion Aled Thomas suggested that the status of a person's level creates an internal class system within the Church.

The Church claims that the material taught in the OT levels can only be comprehended once its previous material has been mastered and is therefore kept confidential until a person reaches the requisite level. Higher-level Church members typically refuse to talk about the contents of these OT levels. Those progressing through the OT levels are taught additional, more advanced auditing techniques; one of the techniques taught is a method of auditing oneself, which is the necessary procedure for reaching OT level seven.

Space opera and the Wall of Fire

Reflecting a strong science-fiction theme within its theology, Scientology's teachings make reference to "space opera," a term denoting events in the distant past in which "spaceships, spacemen, [and] intergalactic travel" all feature. This incorporates what the scholar of religion Mikael Rothstein referred to the "Xenu myth", a story concerning humanity's origins on Earth. This myth was something that Rothstein described as being "the basic (sometimes implicit) mythology of the movement".

Hubbard wrote about a great catastrophe that took place 75 million years ago. He referred to this as "Incident 2," one of several "Universal Incidents" that hinder the thetan's ability to remember its origins. According to this story, 75 million years ago there was a Galactic Federation of 76 planets ruled over by a leader called Xenu. The Federation was overpopulated and to deal with this problem Xenu transported large numbers of people to the planet Teegeeack (Earth). He then detonated hydrogen bombs inside volcanoes to exterminate this surplus population. The thetans of those killed were then "packaged," by which Hubbard meant that they were clustered together. Implants were inserted into them, designed to kill any body that these thetans would subsequently inhabit should they recall the event of their destruction. After the Teegeeack massacre, several of the officers in Xenu's service rebelled against him, ultimately capturing and imprisoning him.

According to OT documents discussing Incident 2, the bodies of those Xenu placed on Teegeeack were destroyed but their inner thetans survived and continue to carry the trauma of this event. Scientology maintains that some of these traumatised thetans which lack bodies of their own become "body thetans," clustering around living people and negatively impacting them. Many of the advanced auditing techniques taught to Scientologists focus on dealing with these body thetans, awakening them from the amnesia they experience and allowing them to detach from the bodies they cluster around. Once free they are capable of either being born into bodies of their choosing or remaining detached from any physical form.

Hubbard claimed to have discovered the Xenu myth in December 1967, having taken the "plunge" deep into his "time track". He commented that he was "probably the only one ever to do so in 75,000,000 years". Scientology teaches that attempting to recover this information from the "time track" typically results in an individual's death, caused by the presence of Xenu's implants, but that because of Hubbard's "technology" this death can be avoided.

As the Church argues that learning the Xenu myth can be harmful for those unprepared for it, the documents discussing Xenu were restricted for those Church members who had reached the OT III level, known as the "Wall of Fire". These OT III teachings about Xenu were later leaked by ex-members, becoming a matter of public record after being submitted as evidence in court cases. They are now widely available online. The Church claims that the leaked documents have been distorted, and that the OT level texts are only religiously meaningful in the context of the OT courses in which they are provided, thus being incomprehensible to outsiders. Church members who have reached the OT III level routinely deny these teachings exist. Hubbard however talked about Xenu on several occasions, the Xenu story bears similarities with some of the science-fiction stories Hubbard published, and Rothstein noted that "substantial themes from the Xenu story are detectable" in Hubbard's book Scientology – A History of Man. 

Critics of Scientology regularly employ reference to Xenu to mock the movement, believing that the story will be regarded as absurd by outsiders and thus prove detrimental to Scientology. Critics have also highlighted factual discrepancies regarding the myth; geologists demonstrate that the Mauna Loa volcano, which appears in the myth, is far younger than 75 million years old. Scientologists nevertheless regard it as a factual account of past events.

Ethics, morality, and gender roles
Scientology sets forth explicit ethical guidelines for its followers to adhere to. In the Scientology worldview, humans are regarded as being essentially good. Its value system was largely compatible with the Protestant-dominant culture in which it arose.
Scientology professes belief in fundamental human rights. The liberal or personal rights of the individual are often stressed as being at the core of the Scientologist's creed, and Scientologists have lead campaigns to promote the Universal Declaration of Human Rights.

Gender and sexuality have been controversial issues in Scientology's history. Women are able to become ministers and rise through the Church ranks in the same manner as men. Hubbard's writing makes androcentric assumptions through its use of language, with critics of Scientology accusing him of being a misogynist. Hubbard's use of language was also heteronormative, and he described same-sex attraction as a perversion and physical illness, rendering homosexuals "extremely dangerous to society." Various Freezone Scientologists have alleged that they encountered homophobia within the Church. The Church's stance on same-sex sexuality has drawn criticism from gay rights activists.

Survival and the Eight Dynamics

Scientology emphasizes the importance of "survival", which it subdivides into eight classifications that are referred to as "dynamics". The first dynamic is individual; the second pertains to procreation and the family; the third to a group or groups a person belongs to; the fourth is humanity; the fifth is the environment; the sixth is the physical universe; the seventh is the spiritual universe; and the eighth is infinity or divinity. According to Hubbard's teaching, the optimum solution to any problem is believed to be the one that brings the greatest benefit to the greatest number of dynamics. Westbrook stated that this "utilitarian principle is central to an understanding of Scientology ethics for church members".

ARC and KRC triangles

The ARC and KRC triangles are concept maps which show a relationship between three concepts to form another concept. These two triangles are present in the Scientology symbol. The lower triangle, the ARC triangle, is a summary representation of the knowledge the Scientologist strives for. It encompasses Affinity (affection, love or liking), Reality (consensual reality) and Communication (the exchange of ideas). Scientology teaches that improving one of the three aspects of the triangle "increases the level" of the other two, but Communication is held to be the most important. The upper triangle is the KRC triangle, the letters KRC positing a similar relationship between Knowledge, Responsibility and Control.

Among Scientologists, the letters ARC are used as an affectionate greeting in personal communication, for example at the end of a letter. Social problems are ascribed to breakdowns in ARC – in other words, a lack of agreement on reality, a failure to communicate effectively, or a failure to develop affinity. These can take the form of overts – harmful acts against another, either intentionally or by omission – which are usually followed by withholds – efforts to conceal the wrongdoing, which further increase the level of tension in the relationship.

Views of Hubbard

Scientologists view Hubbard as an extraordinary man, but do not worship him as a deity. They regard him as the preeminent Operating Thetan who remained on Earth in order to show others the way to spiritual liberation, the man who discovered the source of human misery and a technology allowing everyone to recognise their true potential. Church of Scientology management frames Hubbard's physical death as "dropping his body" to pursue higher levels of research not possible with an Earth-bound body.

Scientologists often refer to Hubbard affectionately as "Ron," and many refer to him as their "friend". The Church operates a calendar in which 1950, the year in which Hubbard's book Dianetics was published, is considered year zero, the beginning of an era. Years after that date are referred to as "AD" for "After Dianetics". They have also buried copies of his writings preserved on stainless steel disks in a secure underground vault in the hope of preserving them from major catastrophe.  The Church's view of Hubbard is presented in their authorised biography of him, their RON series of magazines, and their L. Ron Hubbard Life Exhibition in Los Angeles. The Church's accounts of Hubbard's life have been characterised as being largely hagiographical, seeking to present him as "a person of exceptional character, morals and intelligence". Critics of Hubbard and his Church claim that many of the details of his life as he presented it were false. 

Every Church Org maintains an office set aside for Hubbard in perpetuity, set out to imitate those he used in life, and will typically also have busts of him on display. In 2005 the Church set out certain locations associated with his life as "L. Ron Hubbard Landmark Sites" that Scientologists can visit; these are in the US, UK, and South Africa. Westbrook considered these to be pilgrimage sites for adherents. 
Many Scientologists travel to Saint Hill Manor as a form of pilgrimage.

Scientology ceremonies 

Ceremonies overseen by the Church fall into two main categories; Sunday services and ceremonies marking particular events in a person's life. The latter include weddings, child naming ceremonies, and funerals. Friday services are held to commemorate the completion of a person's services during the prior week. Ordained Scientology ministers may perform such rites. However, these services and the clergy who perform them play only a minor role in Scientologists' lives.

The Church's Sunday services begin with the minister giving a short welcoming speech, after which they read aloud the principles of Scientology and oversee a silent prayer. They then read a text by Hubbard and either give their own sermon or play a recording of Hubbard lecturing. The congregation may then ask the minister questions about what they have just heard. Next, prayers are offered, for justice, religious freedom, spiritual advancement, and for gaining understanding of the Supreme Being. Announcements will then be read out and finally the service will end with a hymn or the playing of music. Some Church members regularly attend these services, whereas others go rarely or never. Services can be poorly attended, although are open for anyone to attend, including non-Scientologists.

There are two main celebrations each year. The first, "the Birthday Event," celebrates Hubbard's birthday each March 13. The second, "the May 9th Event," marks the date on which Dianetics was first published. The main celebrations of these events take place at the Church's Clearwater headquarters, which are filmed and then distributed to other Church centers across the world. On the following weekend, this footage is screened at these centers, so Church members elsewhere can gather to watch it.

Weddings, naming ceremonies, and funerals

At Church wedding services, the two partners are requested to remain faithful and assist each other. These weddings employ Scientological terminology, for instance with the minister asking those being married if they have "communicated" their love to each other and mutually "acknowledged" this. The Church's naming ceremony for infants is designed to help orient a thetan in its new body and introduce it to its godparents. During the ceremony, the minister reminds the child's parents and godparents of their duty to assist the newly reborn thetan and to encourage it towards spiritual freedom.

Church funerals may take place in the home or the chapel. If in the latter, there is a procession to the altar, before which the coffin is placed atop a catafalque. The minister reminds those assembled about reincarnation and urges the thetan of the deceased to move on and take a new body. The formal ordination of ministers features the new minister reading aloud the auditor's code and the code of Scientologists and promising to follow them. The new minister is then presented with the eight-pronged cross of the Church on a chain.

Rejection of psychology and psychiatry

Scientology is vehemently opposed to psychiatry and psychology. Psychiatry rejected Hubbard's theories in the early 1950s and in 1951, Hubbard's wife Sara consulted doctors who recommended he "be committed to a private sanatorium for psychiatric observation and treatment of a mental ailment known as paranoid schizophrenia".

Hubbard taught that psychiatrists were responsible for a great many wrongs in the world, saying that psychiatry has at various times offered itself as a tool of political suppression and "that psychiatry spawned the ideology which fired Hitler's mania, turned the Nazis into mass murderers, and created the Holocaust". Hubbard created the anti-psychiatry organization Citizens Commission on Human Rights (CCHR), which operates Psychiatry: An Industry of Death, an anti-psychiatry museum.

From 1969, CCHR has campaigned in opposition to psychiatric treatments, electroconvulsive shock therapy, lobotomy, and drugs such as Ritalin and Prozac. According to the official Church of Scientology website, "the effects of medical and psychiatric drugs, whether painkillers, tranquilizers or 'antidepressants', are as disastrous" as illegal drugs. Internal Church documents reveal the intent of eradicating psychiatry and replacing them with therapies from Scientology.

Organization

The Church of Scientology

The Church is headquartered at the Flag Land Base in Clearwater, Florida. This base covers two million square feet and comprises about 50 buildings. The Church operates on a hierarchical and top-down basis, being largely bureaucratic in structure. It claims to be the only true voice of Scientology.
The internal structure of Scientology organizations is strongly bureaucratic with a focus on statistics-based management. Organizational operating budgets are performance-related and subject to frequent reviews.

By 2011, the Church was claiming over 700 centres in 65 countries. Smaller centres are called "missions". The largest number of these are in the U.S., with the second largest number being in Europe. Missions are established by missionaries, who in Church terminology are called "mission holders". Church members can establish a mission wherever they wish, but must fund it themselves; the missions are not financially supported by the central Church organization. Mission holders must purchase all of the necessary material from the Church; as of 2001, the Mission Starter Pack cost $35,000.

Each mission or Org is a corporate entity, established as a licensed franchise, and operating as a commercial company. Each franchise sends part of its earnings, which have been generated through beginner-level auditing, to the International Management. Bromley observed that an entrepreneurial incentive system pervades the Church, with individual members and organisations receiving payment for bringing in new people or for signing them up for more advanced services. The individual and collective performances of different members and missions are gathered, being called "stats". Performances that are an improvement on the previous week are termed "up stats;" those that show a decline are "down stats".

According to leaked tax documents, the Church of Scientology International and Church of Spiritual Technology in the US had a combined $1.7 billion in assets in 2012, in addition to annual revenues estimated at $200 million a year.

Internal organization

The Sea Org is the Church's primary management unit, containing the highest ranks in the Church hierarchy. Westbrook called its members "the church's clergy". Its members are often recruited from the children of existing Scientologists, and sign up to a "billion-year contract" to serve the Church. Kent described that for adult Sea Org members with minor children, their work obligations took priority, damaged parent-child relations, and has led to cases of severe child neglect and endangerment.

The Church of Scientology International (CSI) co-ordinates all other branches. In 1982, it founded the Religious Technology Centre to oversee the application of its methods. Missionary activity is overseen by the Scientology Missions International, established in 1981.

The Rehabilitation Project Force (RPF) is the Church's disciplinary program, one which deals with SeaOrg members deemed to have seriously deviated from its teachings. When Sea Org members are found guilty of a violation, they are assigned to the RPF; they will often face a hearing, the "Committee of Evidence," which determines if they will be sent to the RPF. The RPF operates out of several locations. The RPF involves a daily regimen of five hours of auditing or studying, eight hours of work, often physical labor, such as building renovation, and at least seven hours of sleep. Douglas E. Cowan and David G. Bromley state that scholars and observers have come to radically different conclusions about the RPF and whether it is "voluntary or coercive, therapeutic or punitive". Critics have condemned RPF practices for violating human rights; and criticized the Church for placing children as young as twelve into the RPF, engaging them in forced labor and denying access to their parents, violating Article 8 of the European Convention on Human Rights. The RPF has contributed to characterisations of the Church as a cult.

The Office of Special Affairs or OSA (formerly the Guardian's Office) is a department of the Church of Scientology which has been characterized as a non-state intelligence agency. It has targeted critics of the organization for "dead agent" operations, which is mounting character assassination operations against perceived enemies.
A 1990 article in the Los Angeles Times reported that in the 1980s the Scientology organization more commonly used private investigators, including former and current Los Angeles police officers, to give themselves a layer of protection in case embarrassing tactics were used and became public.

The Church of Spiritual Technology (CST) has been described as the "most secret organization in all of Scientology".
Shelly Miscavige, wife of leader David Miscavige, who hasn't been seen in public since 2007, is said to be held at a CST compound in Twin Peaks, California.

Scientology operates hundreds of Churches and Missions around the world. This is where Scientologists receive introductory training, and it is at this local level that most Scientologists participate. Churches and Missions are licensed franchises; they may offer services for a fee provided they contribute a proportion of their income and comply with the Religious Technology Center (RTC) and its standards.

The International Association of Scientologists operates to advance the cause of the Church and its members across the world.

Promotional material

The Church employs a range of media to promote itself and attract converts. Hubbard promoted Scientology through a vast range of books, articles, and lectures. The Church publishes several magazines, including Source, Advance, The Auditor, and Freedom. It has established a publishing press, New Era, and the audiovisual publisher Golden Era. The Church has also used the Internet for promotional purposes. The Church has employed advertising to attract potential converts, including in high-profile locations such as television ads during the 2014 and 2020 Super Bowls.

The Church has long used celebrities as a means of promoting itself, starting with Hubbard's "Project Celebrity" in 1955 and followed by its first Scientology Celebrity Centre in 1969. The Celebrity Centre headquarters is in Hollywood; other branches are in Dallas, Nashville, Las Vegas, New York City, and Paris. They are described as places where famous people can work on their spiritual development without disruption from fans or the press.
In 1955, Hubbard created a list of 63 celebrities targeted for conversion to Scientology. Prominent celebrities who have joined the Church include John Travolta, Tom Cruise, Kirstie Alley, Nancy Cartwright, and Juliette Lewis. The Church uses celebrity involvement to make itself appear more desirable. Other new religious movements have similarly pursued celebrity involvement such as the Church of Satan, Transcendental Meditation, ISKCON, and the Kabbalah Centre.

Social outreach

The applicability of Hubbard's teachings also led to the formation of secular organizations focused on fields such as drug abuse awareness and rehabilitation, literacy, and human rights. Several Scientology organizations promote the use of Scientology practices as a means to solve social problems. Scientology began to focus on these issues in the early 1970s, led by Hubbard. The Church of Scientology developed outreach programs to fight drug addiction, illiteracy, learning disabilities and criminal behavior. These have been presented to schools, businesses and communities as secular techniques based on Hubbard's writings.

The Church places emphasis on impacting society through a range of social outreach programs. To that end it has established a network of organizations involved in humanitarian efforts, most of which operate on a not-for-profit basis. These endeavor's reflect Scientology's lack of confidence in the state's ability to build a just society. Launched in 1966, Narconon is the Church's drug rehabilitation program, which employs Hubbard's theories about drugs and treats addicts through auditing, exercise, saunas, vitamin supplements, and healthy eating. Criminon is the Church's criminal rehabilitation programme. Its Applied Scholastics program, established in 1972, employs Hubbard's pedagogical methods to help students. The Way to Happiness Foundation promotes a moral code written by Hubbard, to date translated into more than 40 languages. Narconon, Criminon, Applied Scholastics, and The Way to Happiness operate under the management banner of Association for Better Living and Education.
The World Institute of Scientology Enterprises (WISE) applies Scientology practices to business management. The most prominent training supplier to make use of Hubbard's technology is Sterling Management Systems.

Hubbard devised the Volunteer Minister Program in 1973. Wearing distinctive yellow shirts, the Church's Volunteer Ministers offer help and counselling to those in distress; this includes the Scientological technique of providing "assists". After the September 11, 2001 terrorist attack in New York City, Volunteer Ministers were on the site of Ground Zero within hours of the attack, assisting the rescue workers; they subsequently went to New Orleans after Hurricane Katrina. Accounts of the Volunteer Ministers' effectiveness have been mixed, and touch assists are not supported by scientific evidence. The Church's critics regard this outreach as merely a public relations exercise.

The Church employs its Citizens Commission on Human Rights to combat psychiatry, while Scientologists Taking Action Against Discrimination (STAND) does public relations for Scientology and Scientologists.
The Church's National Commission on Law Enforcement and Human Rights targets what it perceives as abusive acts conducted by governmental and inter-governmental organizations like the IRS, Department of Justice, Central Intelligence Agency, and Interpol. Through these projects, the Church sees itself as "clearing the planet," seeking to return humanity to its natural state of happiness.

Responses to opponents

The Church regards itself as the victim of media and governmental persecution, and the scholar of religion Douglas Cowan observed that "claims to systematic persecution and harassment" are part of the Church's culture. In turn, Urban noted the Church has "tended to respond very aggressively to its critics, mounting numerous lawsuits and at times using extralegal means to respond to those who threaten it." The Church has often responded to criticism by targeting the character of their critic. The Church's approach to targeting their critics has often generated more negative attention for their organization, with Lewis commenting that the Church "has proven to be its own worst enemy" in this regard.

The Church has a reputation for litigiousness stemming from its involvement in a large number of legal conflicts. Barrett characterised the Church as "one of the most litigious religions in the world". It has conducted lawsuits against governments, organizations, and individuals, both to counter criticisms made against it and to gain legal recognition as a religion. Its efforts to achieve the latter have also facilitated other minority groups to doing the same. J.P. Kumar, who studied the Church's litigation, argued that victory was not always important to the organization; what was important was depleting the resources and energies of its critics. The Church's litigiousness has been compared to that of the Jehovah's Witnesses during the first half of the 20th century.

Suppressive Persons and Fair Game

Those deemed hostile to the Church, including ex-members, are labelled "Suppressive Persons" or SPs. Hubbard maintained that 20 percent of the population would be classed as "suppressive persons" because were truly malevolent or dangerous: "the Adolf Hitlers and the Genghis Khans, the unrepentant murderers and the drug lords". If the Church declares that one of its members is an SP, all other Church members are forbidden from further contact with them, an act it calls "disconnection". Any member breaking this rule is labelled a "Potential Trouble Source" (PTS) and unless they swiftly cease all contact they can be labelled an SP themselves. 

In an October 1968 letter to members, Hubbard wrote about a policy called "Fair Game" which was directed at SPs and other perceived threats to the Church. Here he stated that these individuals "may be deprived of property or injured by any means by any Scientologist without any discipline of the Scientologists. May be tricked, sued or lied to or destroyed". Following strong criticism, the Church formally ended Fair Game a month later, with Hubbard stating that he had never intended "to authorize illegal or harassment type acts against anyone." The Church's critics and some scholarly observers argue that its practices reflect that the policy remains in place. It is "widely asserted" by former Church members that Fair Game is still employed; Stacy Brooks, a former member of the Church's Office of Special Affairs, stated in court that "practices which were formerly called 'Fair Game' continue to be employed, although the term 'Fair Game' is no longer used."

Hubbard and his followers targeted many individuals as well as government officials and agencies, including a program of illegal infiltration of the IRS and other U.S. government agencies during the 1970s. They also conducted private investigations, character assassination and legal action against the organization's critics in the media.

The Ethics system regulates member behavior, and Ethics officers are present in every Scientology organization. Ethics officers ensure "correct application of Scientology technology" and deal with "behavior adversely affecting a Scientology organization's performance", ranging from "Errors" and "Misdemeanors" to "Crimes" and "Suppressive Acts", as those terms defined by Scientology.

Freezone Scientology
The term "Freezone" is used for the large but loose grouping of Scientologists who are not members of the Church of Scientology. Those within it are sometimes called "Freezoners". Some of those outside the Church prefer to describe their practices as "Independent Scientology" because of the associations that the term "Freezone" has with Ron's Org and the innovations developed by Robertson; "Independent Scientology" is a more recent term than "Freezone".

Key to the Freezone is what scholar of religion Aled Thomas called its "largely unregulated and non-hierarchical environment". Within the Freezone there are many different interpretations of Scientology; Thomas suggested Freezone Scientologists were divided between "purists" who emphasize loyalty to Hubbard's teachings and those more open to innovation. Freezoners typically stress that Scientology as a religion is different from the Church of Scientology as an organization, criticizing the latter's actions rather than their beliefs. They often claim to be the true inheritors of Hubbard's teachings, maintaining that Scientology's primary focus is on individual development and that that does not require a leader or membership of an organization. Some Freezoners argue that auditing should be more affordable than it is as performed by the Church, and criticise the Church's lavish expenditure on Org buildings.

The Church has remained hostile to the Freezone, regarding it as heretical. It refers to non-members who either practice Scientology or simply adopt elements of its technology as "squirrels," and their activities as "squirreling". The term "squirrels" was coined by Hubbard and originally referred only to non-Scientologists using its technology. The Church also maintains that any use of its technology by non-Church members is dangerous as they may not be used correctly. Freezone Scientologists have also accused the Church of "squirrelling," maintaining that it has changed Hubbard's words in various posthumous publications. Lewis has suggested that the Freezone has been fueled by some of the Church's policies, including Hubbard's tendency to eject senior members whom he thought could rival him and the Church's "suppressive persons" policy which discouraged rapprochement with ex-members.

Freezone Groups

The term "Free Zone" was first coined in 1984 by Bill Robertson, an early associate of Hubbard's. That year, Robertson founded Ron's Org, a loose federation of Scientology groups operating outside the Church. Headquartered in Switzerland, Ron's Org has affiliated centers in Germany, Russia, and other former parts of the Soviet Union. Robertson claimed that he was channelling messages from Hubbard after the latter's death, through which he discovered OT levels above the eight then being offered by the Church. Although its founding members were formerly part of the Church, as it developed most of those who joined had had no prior involvement in the Church.
Another non-Church group was the Advanced Ability Center, founded by David Mayo in the Santa Barbara area. The Church eventually succeeded in shutting it down. In 2012, a Scientology center in Haifa, Israel, defected from the Church.

As well as these organizations, there are also small groups of Scientologists outside the Church who meet informally. Some avoid establishing public centers and communities for fear of legal retribution from the Church. There are also Free Zone practitioners who practice what Thomas calls a "very individualized form of Scientology," encouraging innovation with Hubbard's technology.

Controversies

Urban described the Church of Scientology as "the world's most controversial new religion", while Lewis termed it "arguably the most persistently controversial" of contemporary new religious movements. According to Urban, the Church had "a documented history of extremely problematic behavior ranging from espionage against government agencies to shocking attacks on critics of the Church and abuse of its own members."

A first point of controversy was its challenge of the psychotherapeutic establishment. Another was a 1991 Time magazine article that attacked the organization, which responded with a major lawsuit that was rejected by the court as baseless early in 1992. A third is its religious tax status in the United States, as the IRS granted the organization tax-exempt status in 1993.

It has been in conflict with the governments and police forces of many countries (including the United States, the United Kingdom, Canada, France and Germany). It has been one of the most litigious religious movements in history, filing countless lawsuits against governments, organizations and individuals.

Reports and allegations have been made, by journalists, courts, and governmental bodies of several countries, that the Church of Scientology is an unscrupulous commercial enterprise that harasses its critics and brutally exploits its members. A considerable amount of investigation has been aimed at the organization, by groups ranging from the media to governmental agencies.

The controversies involving the Church of Scientology, some of them ongoing, include:
 Criminal behavior by members of the organization, including the infiltration of the US Government.
 Organized harassment of people perceived as enemies of the Church of Scientology.
 Scientology's disconnection policy, in which some members are required to shun friends or family members who are "antagonistic" to the organization.
 The death of Scientologist Lisa McPherson while in the care of the organization. (Robert Minton sponsored the multimillion-dollar lawsuit against Scientology for the death of McPherson. In May 2004, McPherson's estate and the Church of Scientology reached a confidential settlement.)
 Attempts to legally force search engines to censor information critical of the Scientology organization.
 Allegations the organization's leader David Miscavige beats and demoralizes staff, and that physical violence by superiors towards staff working for them is a common occurrence in the organization. Scientology spokesman Tommy Davis denied these claims and provided witnesses to rebut them.

Scientology social programs such as drug and criminal rehabilitation have likewise drawn both support and criticism.

Stephen A. Kent, a professor of sociology, has said that "Scientologists see themselves as possessors of doctrines and skills that can save the world, if not the galaxy."  As stated in Scientology doctrine: "The whole agonized future of this planet, every man, woman and child on it, and your own destiny for the next endless trillions of years depend on what you do here and now with and in Scientology." Kent has described Scientology's ethics system as "a peculiar brand of morality that uniquely benefited [the Church of Scientology] ... In plain English, the purpose of Scientology ethics is to eliminate opponents, then eliminate people's interests in things other than Scientology."

Many former members have come forward to speak out about the organization and the negative effects its teachings have had on them, including celebrities such as Leah Remini. Remini spoke about her split from the Church of Scientology, saying that she still has friends within the organization whom she is no longer able to speak with.

Hubbard's motives
Hubbard's critics often see attacking his life story as a means of delegitimising Dianetics and Scientology. Common criticisms directed at Hubbard was that he drew upon pre-existing sources and the allegation that he was motivated by financial reasons.
During his lifetime, Hubbard was accused of using religion as a façade for Scientology to maintain tax-exempt status and avoid prosecution for false medical claims. The IRS cited a statement frequently attributed to Hubbard that the way to get rich was to found a religion. Many of Hubbard's science fiction colleagues, including Sam Merwin, Lloyd Arthur Eshbach and Sam Moscowitz, recall Hubbard raising the topic in conversation. 

Hubbard grew up in a climate that was very critical of organized religion, and frequently quoted anti-religious sentiments in his early lectures. The scholar Marco Frenschkowski (University of Mainz) has stated that it was not easy for Hubbard "to come to terms with the spiritual side of his own movement. Hubbard did not want to found a religion: he discovered that what he was talking about in fact was religion. This mainly happened when he had to deal with apparent memories from former lives. He had to defend himself about this to his friends." 

Frenschkowski allows that there were practical concerns in the question of "how to present Scientology to the outside world", but dismisses the notion that the religious format was just an expedient pretense; Frenschkowski points to many passages in Hubbard's works that document his struggle with this question. Frenschkowski suggests that it was a biographical mistake to suggest that Hubbard only became interested in Scientology as a religion in 1954. He notes that Hubbard discussed religion and the concept of god even in the years leading up to the emergence of Scientology, and that he did not "rush into religion" but rather, "discovered it through the development of his work with pre-clears".

Drawing parallels to similar struggles for identity in other religious movements such as Theosophy and Transcendental Meditation, Frenschkowski sees in Hubbard's lectures "the case of a man whose background was non-religious and who nevertheless discovers that his ideas somehow oscillate between 'science' (in a very popular sense), 'religion' and 'philosophy', and that these ideas somehow fascinate so many people that they start to form a separate movement". Hubbard experiments with traditional religious language in a short piece written in 1953 called "The Factors", "a basic expression of Scientologist cosmology and metaphysics", reprinted in current Scientology literature. Frenschkowski observes that the text is partly biblical in structure and that this development is a component of Scientology's metamorphosis into a religion, written at a point when the nature of the new movement was unclear.

The Church of Scientology says that the idea of Hubbard starting a religion for personal gain is an unfounded rumor. The organization also suggests that the origin of the rumor was a remark by George Orwell which had been misattributed to Hubbard. Robert Vaughn Young, who left the organization in 1989 after being its spokesman for 20 years, suggested that reports of Hubbard making such a statement could be explained as a misattribution, despite having encountered three of Hubbard's associates from his science fiction days who remembered Hubbard making statements of that sort in person. 

It was Young who by a stroke of luck came up with the "Orwell quote": "but I have always thought there might be a lot of cash in starting a new religion, and we'll talk it over some time". It appears in a letter by Eric Blair (known to the world as George Orwell) to his friend, Jack Common, dated 16 February 1938, and was published in Collected Essays, Journalism and Letters of George Orwell, vol. 1. In 2006, Rolling Stone'''s Janet Reitman also attributed the statement to Hubbard, as a remark to science fiction writer Lloyd Eshbach and recorded in Eshbach's autobiography.

Criminal behavior

Much of the controversy surrounding Scientology stems from the criminal convictions of core members of the Scientology organization.

In 1978, a number of Scientologists, including L. Ron Hubbard's wife Mary Sue Hubbard (who was second in command in the organization at the time), were convicted of perpetrating what was at the time the largest incident of domestic espionage in the history of the United States, called "Operation Snow White". This involved infiltrating, wiretapping, and stealing documents from the offices of Federal attorneys and the Internal Revenue Service. L. Ron Hubbard was convicted in absentia by French authorities of engaging in fraud and sentenced to four years in prison. The head of the French Church of Scientology was convicted at the same trial and given a suspended one-year prison sentence.

An FBI raid on the Church of Scientology's headquarters revealed documentation that detailed Scientology's criminal actions against various critics of the organization. In "Operation Freakout", agents of the organization attempted to destroy Paulette Cooper, author of The Scandal of Scientology, an early book that had been critical of the movement.  Among these documents was a plan to frame Gabe Cazares, the mayor of Clearwater, Florida, with a staged hit-and-run accident. Nine individuals related to the case were prosecuted on charges of theft, burglary, conspiracy, and other crimes.

In 1988, Scientology president Heber Jentzsch and ten other members of the organization were arrested in Spain on various charges including illicit association, coercion, fraud, and labor law violations.

In October 2009, the Church of Scientology was found guilty of organized fraud in France. The sentence was confirmed by the court of appeal in February 2012, and by the supreme Court of Cassation in October 2013.

In 2012, Belgian prosecutors indicted Scientology as a criminal organization engaged in fraud
and extortion. In March 2016, the Church of Scientology was acquitted of all charges, and demands to close its Belgian branch and European headquarters were dismissed.

Organized harassment

Scientology has historically engaged in hostile action toward its critics; executives within the organization have proclaimed that Scientology is "not a turn-the-other-cheek religion". Journalists, politicians, former Scientologists and various anti-cult groups have made accusations of wrongdoing against Scientology since the 1960s, and Scientology has targeted these critics – almost without exception – for retaliation, in the form of lawsuits and public counter-accusations of personal wrongdoing. Many of Scientology's critics have also reported they were subject to threats and harassment in their private lives.

According to a 1990 Los Angeles Times article, Scientology had largely switched from using Church members to using private investigators, including former and current Los Angeles police officers, as this gives the organization a layer of protection in case investigators use tactics which might cause the organization embarrassment.  In one case, the organization described their tactics as "LAPD sanctioned", which was energetically disputed by Police Chief Daryl Gates.  The officer involved in this particular case of surveillance and harassment was suspended for six months.

Journalist John Sweeney reported that  "While making our BBC Panorama film Scientology and Me I have been shouted at, spied on, had my hotel invaded at midnight, denounced as a 'bigot' by star Scientologists, brain-washed—that is how it felt to me—in a mock up of a Nazi-style torture chamber and chased round the streets of Los Angeles by sinister strangers".

Violation of auditing confidentiality

During the auditing process, the auditor collects and records personal information from the client.

While the Church of Scientology claims to protect the confidentiality of auditing records, the organization has a history of attacking and psychologically abusing former members using information culled from the records. For example, a December 16, 1969, a Guardian's Office order (G. O. 121669) by Mary Sue Hubbard explicitly authorized the use of auditing records for purposes of "internal security". Former members report having participated in combing through information obtained in auditing sessions to see if it could be used for smear campaigns against critics.

Allegation of coerced abortions

The Sea Org originally operated on vessels at sea where it was understood that it was  not permitted to raise children on board the ships. Pregnant women in the Sea Org have stated that they had been pressured to undergo abortions.

In 2003, The Times of India reported "Forced abortions, beatings, starvation are considered tools of discipline in this church".

A former high-ranking source reports that "some 1,500 abortions" have been "carried out by women in the Sea Organization since the implementation of a rule in the late 80s that members could not remain in the organization if they decided to have children".  The source noted that "And if members who have been in the Sea Organization for, say, 10 years do decide to have kids, they are dismissed with no more than $1,000" as a severance package.

Many former members have said they were pressured to undergo abortion.

Longtime member Astra Woodcraft reportedly "left Scientology for good when the church tried to pressure her to have an abortion".  Former Sea Org member Karen Pressley recounted that she was often asked by fellow Scientologists for loans so that they could get an abortion and remain in the Sea Org. Scientology employee Claire Headley has said she "was forced to have (two) abortions to keep her job and was subjected to violations of personal rights and liberties for the purpose of obtaining forced labor".  Laura Ann DeCrescenzo reported she was "coerced to have an abortion" as a minor.

In March 2009, Maureen Bolstad reported that women who worked at Scientology's headquarters were forced to have abortions, or faced being declared a "Suppressive Person" by the organization's management.  In March 2010, former Scientologist Janette Lang stated that at age 20 she became pregnant by her boyfriend while in the organization, and her boyfriend's Scientology supervisors "coerced them into terminating the pregnancy". "We fought for a week, I was devastated, I felt abused, I was lost and eventually I gave in. It was my baby, my body and my choice, and all of that was taken away from me by Scientology," said Lang.

Australian Senator Nick Xenophon gave a speech to the Australian Parliament in November 2009, about statements he had received from former Scientologists. He said that he had been told members of the organization had coerced pregnant female employees to have abortions. "I am deeply concerned about this organisation and the devastating impact it can have on its followers," said Senator Xenophon, and he requested that the Australian Senate begin an investigation into Scientology. According to the letters presented by Senator Xenophon, the organization was involved in "ordering" its members to have abortions. 

Former Scientologist Aaron Saxton sent a letter to Senator Xenophon stating he had participated in coercing pregnant women within the organization to have abortions. "Aaron says women who fell pregnant were taken to offices and bullied to have an abortion. If they refused, they faced demotion and hard labour. Aaron says one staff member used a coat hanger and self-aborted her child for fear of punishment," said Senator Xenophon. Carmel Underwood, another former Scientologist, said she had been put under "extreme pressure" to have an abortion, and that she was placed into a "disappearing programme", after refusing. Underwood was the executive director of Scientology's branch in Sydney, Australia.

Scientology spokesman Tommy Davis said these statements are "utterly meritless".  Mike Ferriss, the head of Scientology in New Zealand, told media that "There are no forced abortions in Scientology". Scientology spokesperson Virginia Stewart likewise rejected the statements and asserted "The Church of Scientology considers the family unit and children to be of the utmost importance and does not condone nor force anyone to undertake any medical procedure whatsoever."

Allegation of human trafficking and other crimes against women
A number of women have sued the Church of Scientology, alleging a variety of complaints including human trafficking, rape, forced labor, and child abuse. In 2009, Marc and Claire Headley sued the Church of Scientology alleging human trafficking.

Scientology, litigation, and the Internet

In the 1990s, Miscavige's organization took action against increased criticism of Scientology on the Internet and online distribution of Scientology-related documents.

Starting in 1991, Scientology filed fifty lawsuits against Scientology-critic Cult Awareness Network (CAN). Many of the suits were dismissed, but one resulted in $2 million in losses, bankrupting the network. At bankruptcy, CAN's name and logo were obtained by a Scientologist. A New Cult Awareness Network was set up with Scientology backing, which says it operates as an information and networking center for non-traditional religions, referring callers to academics and other experts.

In a 1993 U.S. lawsuit brought by the Church of Scientology against former member Steven Fishman, Fishman made a court declaration which included several dozen pages of formerly secret esoterica detailing aspects of Scientologist cosmogony. As a result of the litigation, this material, normally strictly safeguarded and used only in Scientology's more advanced "OT levels", found its way onto the Internet. This resulted in a battle between the Church of Scientology and its online critics over the right to disclose this material, or safeguard its confidentiality. The Church of Scientology was forced to issue a press release acknowledging the existence of this cosmogony, rather than allow its critics "to distort and misuse this information for their own purposes". Even so, the material, notably the story of Xenu, has since been widely disseminated and used to caricature Scientology, despite the Church of Scientology's vigorous program of copyright litigation.

In January 1995, Church of Scientology lawyer Helena Kobrin attempted to shut down the newsgroup alt.religion.scientology by sending a control message instructing Usenet servers to delete the group. In practice, this rmgroup message had little effect, since most Usenet servers are configured to disregard such messages when sent to groups that receive substantial traffic, and newgroup messages were quickly issued to recreate the group on those servers that did not do so. However, the issuance of the message led to a great deal of public criticism by free-speech advocates.Mike Godwin Cyber Rights, p. 219, Massachusetts Institute of Technology Press, 2003  Among the criticisms raised, one suggestion is that Scientology's true motive is to suppress the free speech of its critics.Wendy Grossman Net.wars, p. 90, New York University Press, 1997 

The Church of Scientology also began filing lawsuits against those who posted copyrighted texts on the newsgroup and the World Wide Web, lobbied for tighter restrictions on copyrights in general, and supported the controversial Sonny Bono Copyright Term Extension Act as well as the even more controversial Digital Millennium Copyright Act (DMCA).

Beginning in the middle of 1996 and ensuing for several years, the newsgroup was attacked by anonymous parties using a tactic dubbed sporgery by some, in the form of hundreds of thousands of forged spam messages posted on the group. Some investigators said that some spam had been traced to members of the Church of Scientology.Wendy Grossman Net.wars, pp. 74–76, NYU Press, 1997  Former Scientologist Tory Christman later asserted that the Office of Special Affairs had undertaken a concerted effort to destroy alt.religion.scientology through these means; the effort failed.

On January 14, 2008, a video produced by the Church of Scientology featuring an interview with Tom Cruise was leaked to the Internet and uploaded to YouTube.
The Church of Scientology issued a copyright violation claim against YouTube requesting the removal of the video. Calling the action by the Church of Scientology a form of Internet censorship, participants of Anonymous coordinated Project Chanology, consisting of a series of denial-of-service attacks against Scientology websites, prank calls, and black faxes to Scientology centers. 

On January 21, 2008, Anonymous announced its intentions via a video posted to YouTube entitled "Message to Scientology", and a press release declaring a "war" against the Church of Scientology and the Religious Technology Center. In the press release, the group stated that the attacks against the Church of Scientology would continue in order to protect the freedom of speech, and end what they saw as the financial exploitation of members of the organization.

On January 28, 2008, an Anonymous video appeared on YouTube calling for protests outside Church of Scientology buildings on February 10, 2008. The date was chosen because it was the birthday of Lisa McPherson. According to a letter Anonymous e-mailed to the press, about 7,000 people protested in more than 90 cities worldwide. Many protesters wore masks based on the character V from V for Vendetta (who was influenced by Guy Fawkes) or otherwise disguised their identities, in part to protect themselves from reprisals from the Church of Scientology. Many further protests have followed since then in cities around the world.

The Arbitration Committee of the Wikipedia internet encyclopedia decided in May 2009 to restrict access to its site from Church of Scientology IP addresses, to prevent self-serving edits by Scientologists. A "host of anti-Scientologist editors" were topic-banned as well. The committee concluded that both sides had "gamed policy" and resorted to "battlefield tactics", with articles on living persons being the "worst casualties".

Disputes over legal status

The legal status of Scientology or Scientology-related organizations differs between jurisdictions.  Scientology was legally recognized as a tax-exempt religion in Australia, Portugal, and Spain. Scientology was granted tax-exempt status in the United States in 1993. The organization is considered a cult in Chile and an  "anticonstitutional sect" in Germany, and is considered a cult (French secte) by some French public authorities.

The Church of Scientology argues that Scientology is a genuine religious movement that has been misrepresented, maligned, and persecuted.  The organization has pursued an extensive public relations campaign for the recognition of Scientology as a tax-exempt religion in the various countries in which it exists.

The Church of Scientology has often generated opposition due to its strong-arm tactics directed against critics and members wishing to leave the organization. A minority of governments regard it as a religious organization entitled to tax-exempt status, while other governments variously classify it as a business, cult, pseudoreligion, or criminal organization.

In 1957, the Church of Scientology of California was granted tax-exempt status by the United States Internal Revenue Service (IRS), and so, for a time, were other local branches of the organization. In 1958 however, the IRS started a review of the appropriateness of this status. In 1959, Hubbard moved to England, remaining there until the mid-1960s.

In the mid-sixties, the Church of Scientology was banned in several Australian states, starting with Victoria in 1965. The ban was based on the Anderson Report, which found that the auditing process involved "command" hypnosis, in which the hypnotist assumes "positive authoritative control" over the patient. On this point the report stated, It is the firm conclusion of this Board that most scientology and dianetic techniques are those of authoritative hypnosis and as such are dangerous ... the scientific evidence which the Board heard from several expert witnesses of the highest repute ... leads to the inescapable conclusion that it is only in name that there is any difference between authoritative hypnosis and most of the techniques of scientology. Many scientology techniques are in fact hypnotic techniques, and Hubbard has not changed their nature by changing their names. The Australian Church was forced to operate under the name of the "Church of the New Faith" as a result, the name and practice of Scientology having become illegal in the relevant states. Several years of court proceedings aimed at overturning the ban followed. In 1973, state laws banning Scientology were overturned in Victoria, South Australia and Western Australia. In 1983 the High Court of Australia ruled in a unanimous decision that the Church of Scientology was "undoubtedly a religion and deserving of tax exemption".

In 1967, the IRS removed Scientology's tax-exempt status, asserting that its activities were commercial and operated for the benefit of Hubbard, rather than for charitable or religious purposes.

Scientology in religious studies
Hugh B. Urban writes that "Scientology's efforts to get itself defined as a religion make it an ideal case study for thinking about how we understand and define religion."

Frank K. Flinn, adjunct professor of religious studies at Washington University in St. Louis wrote, "it is abundantly clear that Scientology has both the typical forms of ceremonial and celebratory worship and its own unique form of spiritual life." Flinn further states that religion requires "beliefs in something transcendental or ultimate, practices (rites and codes of behavior) that re-inforce those beliefs and, a community that is sustained by both the beliefs and practices", all of which are present within Scientology. Similarly, World Religions in America states that "Scientology contains the same elements of most other religions, including myths, scriptures, doctrines, worship, sacred practices and rituals, moral and ethical expectations, a community of believers, clergy, and ecclesiastic organizations."

While acknowledging that a number of his colleagues accept Scientology as a religion, sociologist Stephen A. Kent writes: "Rather than struggling over whether or not to label Scientology as a religion, I find it far more helpful to view it as a multifaceted transnational corporation, only one element of which is religious" [emphasis in the original].
Donna Batten in the Gale Encyclopedia of American Law writes, "A belief does not need to be stated in traditional terms to fall within First Amendment protection. For example, Scientology—a system of beliefs that a human being is essentially a free and immortal spirit who merely inhabits a body—does not propound the existence of a supreme being, but it qualifies as a religion under the broad definition propounded by the Supreme Court."

The material contained in the OT levels has been characterized as bad science fiction by critics, while others claim it bears structural similarities to gnostic thought and ancient Hindu beliefs of creation and cosmic struggle.

Influences
The general orientation of Hubbard's philosophy owes much to Will Durant, author of the popular 1926 classic The Story of Philosophy; Dianetics is dedicated to Durant. Hubbard's view of a mechanically functioning mind in particular finds close parallels in Durant's work on Spinoza. According to Hubbard himself, Scientology is "the Western anglicized continuance of many early forms of wisdom". Ankerberg and Weldon mention the sources of Scientology to include "the Vedas, Buddhism, Judaism, Gnosticism, Taoism, early Greek civilization and the teachings of Jesus, Nietzsche and Freud". 

Hubbard asserted that Freudian thought was a "major precursor" to Scientology. W. Vaughn Mccall, Professor and Chairman of the Georgia Regents University writes, "Both Freudian theory and Hubbard assume that there are unconscious mental processes that may be shaped by early life experiences, and that these influence later behavior and thought." Both schools of thought propose a "tripartite structure of the mind". Sigmund Freud's psychology, popularized in the 1930s and 1940s, was a key contributor to the Dianetics therapy model, and was acknowledged unreservedly as such by Hubbard in his early works. Hubbard never forgot, when he was 12 years old, meeting Cmdr. Joseph Cheesman Thompson, a U.S. Navy officer who had studied with Freud and when writing to the American Psychological Association in 1949, he stated that he was conducting research based on the "early work of Freud".

In Dianetics, Hubbard cites Hegel as a negative influence — an object lesson in "confusing" writing. According to Mary A. Mann, Scientology is considered nondenominational, accepting all people regardless of their religions background, ethnicity, or educational attainment. Another influence was Alfred Korzybski's General Semantics. Hubbard was friends with fellow science fiction writers A. E. van Vogt and Robert Heinlein, who both wrote science-fiction inspired by Korzybski's writings, such as Vogt's The World of Null-A.   Hubbard's view of the reactive mind has clear and acknowledged parallels with Korzybski's thought; in fact, Korzybski's "anthropometer" may have been what inspired Hubbard's invention of the E-meter.

Beyond that, Hubbard himself named a great many other influences in his own writing – in Scientology 8-8008, for example, these include philosophers from Anaxagoras and Aristotle to Herbert Spencer and Voltaire, physicists and mathematicians like Euclid and Isaac Newton, as well as founders of religions such as Buddha, Confucius, Jesus and Mohammed – but there is little evidence in Hubbard's writings that he studied these figures to any great depth.

As noted, elements of the Eastern religions are evident in Scientology, in particular the concept of karma found in Hinduism and Jainism.James R. Lewis The Oxford Handbook of New Religious Movements, p. 429, Oxford University Press US, 2004  In addition to the links to Hindu texts, Scientology draws from Taoism and Buddhism. According to the Encyclopedia of Community, Scientology "shows affinities with Buddhism and a remarkable similarity to first-century Gnosticism".John A. Saliba (1996): Signs of the Times, Médiaspaul, p. 51

J. Gordon Melton writes that Scientology has its roots in Esoteric thought. He cited the significance of understanding Scientology's appeal as aligned with Esoteric tradition. He argues that Scientology is a "significant revision" and "meaningful revitalization" within the esoteric tradition. Melton states that Scientology can also be traced back to Gnosticism, Manicheanism, Freemasonry and Theosophy.

Demographics

As of 2016, scholarly estimates suggest that there are a maximum of 40,000 Scientologists; this was the estimate given in 2011 by high-level Church defector Jeff Hawkins. They are found mostly in the U.S., Europe, South Africa and Australia.
By the start of the 21st century, the Church was claiming it had 8 million members. Several commentators claim that this number was cumulative rather than collective, amounting to the total number of people who had some involvement in the Church since its founding, some of whom only had one or two auditing sessions. The Church also maintained that it was the world's fastest growing religion, a title also claimed by several other religious groups, including Mormons, modern Pagans, and Baha'i, but which is demonstrably incorrect. Due to its internationally dispersed nature, it is difficult to determine the number of Freezone Scientologists. In 2021, Thomas suggested that the Free Zone was growing, with Lewis commenting that Freezoners may one day outnumber Church members.

The American Religious Identification Survey of the Graduate Center of the City University of New York found 45,000 Scientologists in the United States in 1990, and then 55,000 in 2001, although in 2008 it estimated that that number had dropped to 25,000. Lewis commented that the "pattern of solid growth" he observed in the 2000s seemed "suddenly to have ground to a halt" by the early 2010s. Within the U.S., higher rates of Scientology have been observed in the western states, especially those bordering the Pacific Ocean, than further east. The Canadian census revealed 1,215 Scientologists in 1991 and 1,525 in 2001, down to 1,400 in 2021. The Australian census reported 1,488 Scientologists in 1996 and 2,032 in 2001, before dropping to under 1,700 in 2016. 
The New Zealand census found 207 Scientologists in 1991 and 282 in 2001. Andersen and Wellendorf estimated that there were between 2000 and 4000 Scientologists in Denmark in 2009, with contemporary estimates suggesting between 500 and 1000 active Church members in Sweden. Germany's government estimated around 5000 to 6000 German Church members in 2008, while observers have suggested between 2000 and 4000 in France. The 2021 census in England and Wales recorded 1,800 Scientologists. 

Internationally, the Church's members are largely middle-class. In Australia, Scientologists have been observed as being wealthier and more likely to work in managerial and professional roles than the average citizen. Scientology is oriented towards individualistic and liberal economic values; the scholar of religion Susan J. Palmer observed that Scientologists display "a capitalist ideology that promotes individualistic values." A survey of Danish Scientologists revealed that nearly all voted for liberal or conservative parties on the right of Denmark's political spectrum and took a negative view of socialism. Placing great emphasis on the freedom of the individual, those surveyed believed that the state and its regulations held people down, and felt that the Danish welfare system was excessive. Interviewing Church members in the United States, Westbrook found that most regarded themselves as apolitical, Republicans, or libertarians; fewer than 10 percent supported the Democratic Party.

Recruitment

Most people who join the Church are introduced to it via friends and family. The Church also offers free "personality tests" or "stress tests", typically involving an E-Meter, to attract potential converts. It hopes that if non-Scientologists purchase one service from the Church and feel a benefit from it – a "win" in Church terminology – they are more likely to purchase additional services from the Church. Other recruitment methods include lectures and classes introducing non-Scientologists to the subject. The Church has also claimed that prominent instances in which Scientology has been ridiculed in the media have resulted in a growth of people expressing interest in it.

The Church's own statistics, published in 1998, reveal that 52.6% of those who joined Church activities did so through their family and friendship networks with existing Church members. 18% were drawn in through personality tests, 4.8% through publicity, and 3.1% through lectures.
Westbrook's interviews with Church members determined that most people who joined the Church were initially attracted by "the practical benefits advertised". Westbrook found that various members deepened their involvement after having what they considered to be a spiritual experience, such as exteriorization or a past life memory, in their first few weeks of involvement.

Reception and influence
Scientology has influenced various therapy and spiritual groups formed since the 1960s. Much past-life therapy was influenced by Dianetics, while Werner Erhard's Erhard Seminars Training therapy system also drew on Scientology. Paul Twitchell, who founded Eckankar, had also been a staff member at the Church of Scientology and plagiarised some of Hubbard's writings. In the 1960s, the Process Church of the Final Judgment was established by former Scientologists. In 1986 Harry Palmer – who had previously run a Scientology franchise mission in Elmira, New York for around a decade – established his own group, the Avatar Course.

Barrett noted that "vast amounts" have been written about Scientology, both in support and opposition to it. Much of this literature has been heavily polarised. Scientology has attracted negative publicity since its founding, with criticism of the Church coming from government agencies, the media, and anti-cult groups. Much material critical of the Church was written by ex-members such as Cyril Vosper, Bent Corydon, and Jon Atack. Many of the Church's critics have utilised the Internet, for instance to disseminate leaked OT documents. The Church have sought to sue various websites, including the Usenet group alt.religion.scientologist, for disseminating Hubbard's writings. Urban noted that Scientologists have long maintained that theirs is "a legitimate religious movement that has been misrepresented, maligned, and persecuted by media witch-hunters and McCarthy-style government attacks."

Several human rights organisations have expressed concern about the stance that the French and German government have taken towards Scientologists. Relations between the Church and German government are largely hostile. The German government banned Church members from working in the public sector, fearing the Church to be a threat to democracy. The US State Department has criticised Germany's treatment of Scientologists in its reports on international religious freedom and at least one German Scientologist has received asylum in the US due to their beliefs. In France, conspiracy theories have spread alleging that the Church controls the US government or that it is a front for American imperialism, perhaps run by the Central Intelligence Agency. French Scientologists have reported being fired or refused jobs because of their beliefs, and bombs have been thrown at French Scientology centres; in 2002 one Scientologist sustained permanent injuries as a result. 

Media, popular culture, and academia

Scientology has received an "extraordinary amount" of media interest, although the Church's relationship with the media has been turbulent. In his writings, Hubbard often described journalists in negative terms, for instance calling them "merchants of chaos". He discouraged Scientologists from interacting with journalists, a tendency that, Westbrook argued, has contributed to negative press portrayals of the movement. Many journalists taking a negative stance on the Church have been concerned about potential human rights violations. 

Hubbard had better experiences with scholars than journalists and the Church sometimes views academics as potential allies in its public relations and legal issues. Academic research into Scientology was for several decades comparatively limited compared to the media and public interest in it. This has been attributed to the Church's secrecy, its reputation for litigiousness, and a lack of academic access to documentary material about the organization. Early studies included Roy Wallis' The Road to Total Freedom (1976) and Harriet Whitehead's Renunciation and Reformulation (1987). Research intensified in the early 21st century, and in 2014, the first academic conference on the topic was held, in Antwerp, Belgium. Several academics who have studied the movement have described the Church paying close attention to their work by telephoning them and sending representatives to attend their talks on the subject. Some critics of Scientology have also been hostile to scholars studying it, accusing them of being apologists for it. 

Documentaries about Scientology have typically focused on allegations about the Church's intimidating behavior, greed and brainwashing. Popular examples include Louis Theroux's 2015 documentary My Scientology Movie, and Leah Remini's documentary series Scientology and the Aftermath, drawing on her experience as a Church member. Paul Thomas Anderson's 2012 film The Master features a religious organization called "The Cause" that has similarities to Scientology.
Comedy series have also critiqued Scientology. The most notable was the 2005 South Park episode "Trapped in the Closet", which highlighted the Xenu story and claimed that the Church was a "scam on a global scale". There have also been theatre shows about the Church, such as Cathy Schekelberg's 2017 one-person show Squeeze My Cans about her former life in the Church.

See also
 Scientology and religious groups
 Scientology and sexual orientation

References

Notes

Citations

Sources

 

 
 Behar, Richard (1991). Scientology: The Thriving Cult of Greed and Power, Time'' magazine.

External links

 Church of Scientology homepage
 Scientology – Is This a Religion? by Stephen A. Kent
 An Annotated Bibliographical Survey of Primary and Secondary Literature on L. Ron Hubbard and Scientology
 

 
1952 introductions
Cults
New religious movements